Pucheng County is a county under the jurisdiction of the municipality of Nanping, in northern Fujian province, People's Republic of China, bordering Jiangxi to the northwest and Zhejiang to the east; it is the northernmost county-level division of Fujian.

The county is named for the Nanpu Brook, a major tributary to the Min River.

Geography

Pucheng comprises  in the Wuyi Mountains which separates Fujian and Jiangxi provinces. It borders Songxi County to the southeast, Jianyang District to the south and Wuyishan City (location of the famous UNESCO park) to the west, all within Nanping. The municipality of Shangrao, Jiangxi, borders to the northwest; those of Quzhou, to the north, and Lishui, to the east, are in Zhejiang.

Climate

Culture

Language 
The Pucheng dialect shares some features with Wu, but is classed among the Southern Chinese varieties. It is however not demonstrably a member of the Min subgroup (which covers almost all of Fujian), and pending further research must stand as an isolate - the sole exemplar of the Pucheng group of Southern Chinese. Some Wu dialects and the Northern Min dialect of Shibei are also spoken in Pucheng.

Intangible Cultural Heritage 
 Pucheng-style Papercutting
 Min-school Guqin

Administrative divisions
The county administers 2 street offices, 9 towns and 8 townships. The county executive, legislature and judiciary are in Nanpu Street Office, together with the CPC and PSB branches.

Subdistricts (街道, jiedao)
 Nanpu - the county seat
 Hebin

Towns (镇, zhen)
 Fuling
 Shibei
 Linjiang
 Xianyang
 Shuibeijie
 Yongxing
 Zhongxin
 Liantang
 Jiumu

Townships (乡, xiang)
Wan'an()
Gulou()
Shanxia
Fengxi()
Haocun()
Guancuo()
Panting()
Guanlu()

Transportation

Expressway 
 S0311 Pucheng-Jianning Expressway

Specialty 
 Pucheng Rouyan/Taipingyan
 tofu ball
 osmanthus tea
 wild jujube cake
 baojiu

Archaeology
In 2006 mound tombs of the Wuyue Kingdom were discovered in Guanjiu village. (The kingdom was contemporary with the Spring and Autumn period and Warring States period of the Yellow River-centred Hans). Considered a strongly significant element of Wuyue culture, these are the first such tombs discovered in Fujian Province. 72 bronze funerary articles were excavated from the tombs, making the excavation the largest harvest of bronze items in Fujian archaeological history.

Notable persons
 Ye Jianming, founder and former Chairman of CEFC China Energy Company Limited

References

External links
Pucheng County official site

 
County-level divisions of Fujian
Nanping